Banshtail Union is a union of Mirzapur Upazila, Tangail District, Bangladesh. It is situated  17 km east of Mirzapur and 46 km east of Tangail, The district headquarter.

Demographics
According to the 2011 Bangladesh census, Banshtail Union had 6,897 households and a population of 29,781.

Education
The literacy rate of Banshtail Union is 58.3% (Male-61.6%, Female-55.4%).

See also
 Union Councils of Tangail District

References

Populated places in Dhaka Division
Populated places in Tangail District
Unions of Mirzapur Upazila